Gio or Giò is a nickname, most commonly a shortened form of Giovanni, Giorgio, Giorgi, Giuseppe, or Sergio. It may refer to:

People with the nickname 
 Gio (singer) (born 1990), Spanish singer and actor
 Gio Alvarez (born 1976), Filipino actor
 Gio Aplon (born 1982), South African rugby union footballer
 Giorgio Armani, cf. "Acqua di Giò", a perfume of his
 Gio Benitez (born 1985), American journalist
 Giorgi Kinkladze (born 1970), Georgian footballer
 Gio Dee (born 1992), American hip hop artist
 Giò Di Tonno (born 1973), Italian singer
 Gio González (born 1985), American baseball player
 Gio Petré (born 1937), Swedish actress
 Giò Pomodoro (1930–2002), Italian artist
 Giò Ponti (1891–1979), Italian architect, industrial designer, furniture designer, artist, and publisher.
 Giovana Queiroz (born 2003), Brazilian footballer
 Giò Sada (born 1989), Italian singer
 Gio Washington (born 1973), American musician
 Gio Wiederhold (born 1936), Italian-American computer scientist
 Giovanni van Bronckhorst (born 1975), Dutch footballer
 Mark Giordano (born 1983), Canadian ice hockey player

Fictional characters with the nickname 
 Gio Gio, in the Japanese manga JoJo's Bizarre Adventure

See also 

Lists of people by nickname